Peel Park can refer to: 

Peel Park, Bradford
Peel Park, East Kilbride
Peel Park, Salford
Peel Park (stadium)